Dahu Town is a rural town  in Liuyang City, Hunan Province, People's Republic of China. The town is bordered to the north by Pingjiang County, to the east by Daweishan Town, to the south by Guandu Town, and to the west by Yanxi Town

Administrative divisions
The town is divided into four villages and two communities: 
 Mazhou Community
 Changyi Community
 Jintian Village
 Xiangxing Village
 Shuxiang Village
 Shuhuaxin Village

Geography
The Daxi River flows through the town.

Banbei Reservoir is the largest reservoir and largest water body in the town.

There are a number of popular mountains located immediately adjacent to the townsite which include Mount Liuyang'ao; Mount Lianyun; Mount Huozi'ao; and Mount Wangpojian.

Economy
The town's main industries are agriculture, mining and fireworks.

Education
 Dahu Middle School

Transportation
The County Road X002 passes across the town west to east.

Religion
The Catholic Church is a church in the town.

The Arhat Temple is a Buddhist temple in the town.

The Ancestral Temple of Kong Family is a famous scenic spot, it was originally built in 1586, during the Ming dynasty (1368–1644).

Attractions
The Xiangxing Scenic Spot is an AAA-level tourist attraction in the town.

References

External links

2000 Census information from 

Divisions of Liuyang
Liuyang